The 2012 SEC men's basketball tournament was the postseason men's basketball tournament for the Southeastern Conference held from March 8–11, 2012 in New Orleans at the New Orleans Arena. The first round and quarterfinal rounds were televised through the SEC Network and the semifinals and final were broadcast nationally on ABC.  This was also the first year teams were seeded #1 through #12, as the conference eliminated divisional play prior to the season, although the 2011–12 schedule was still structured based upon the divisions used from 1991–92 through 2010–11. 

This was the last SEC tournament to have 12 teams. The addition of Missouri and Texas A&M from the Big 12 Conference had been announced prior to the season.

Seeds
As of completed games on March 4. Applies tiebreaker as best as possible.

Schedule

Bracket

SEC All-tournament team

 John Jenkins, Vanderbilt MVP
 Erik Murphy, Florida
 Bradley Beal, Florida
 Terrence Jones, Kentucky
 Anthony Davis, Kentucky
 Lance Goulbourne, Vanderbilt

References

2011–12 Southeastern Conference men's basketball season
SEC men's basketball tournament
Basketball
2012 in sports in Louisiana
College sports tournaments in Louisiana